In Greek mythology, Combe was a daughter of the river god Asopus.

Mythology 
Combe was equated with Chalcis, another of Asopus' many daughters, and associated with the island Euboea: the city Chalcis was reported to have been named after "Combe, who was also called Chalcis". Combe was said to have been dubbed Chalcis because she made bronze weapons (χαλκόν chalcon being the Greek word for "bronze"); the mythological tradition also makes her the first woman to cohabit with a man, and mother of one hundred children.

In Nonnus' Dionysiaca, Combe is the consort of the Euboean Socus and mother by him of the seven Corybantes. She and her sons get expelled from the island by Socus and move first to Cnossus and then to Athens. The Corybantes return to Euboea after King Cecrops, their host in Athens, kills Socus, but Combe's individual further destiny is not dealt with. Hesychius of Alexandria indicates Combe as "mother of the Curetes", these being barely distinct from the Corybantes.

Ovid briefly mentions a certain Combe of Pleuron, surnamed Ophias ("daughter or descendant of an Ophius"?), who "on fluttering wings escaped the wounds that were being inflicted by [or on?] her sons", that is, was apparently changed into a bird to escape a danger. Since the myth is otherwise unknown, it remains uncertain whether this Combe is the same character or a different one.

Notes

References 

 Nonnus of Panopolis, Dionysiaca translated by William Henry Denham Rouse (1863-1950), from the Loeb Classical Library, Cambridge, MA, Harvard University Press, 1940.  Online version at the Topos Text Project.
 Nonnus of Panopolis, Dionysiaca. 3 Vols. W.H.D. Rouse. Cambridge, MA., Harvard University Press; London, William Heinemann, Ltd. 1940-1942. Greek text available at the Perseus Digital Library.
 Publius Ovidius Naso, Metamorphoses translated by Brookes More (1859-1942). Boston, Cornhill Publishing Co. 1922. Online version at the Perseus Digital Library.
 Publius Ovidius Naso, Metamorphoses. Hugo Magnus. Gotha (Germany). Friedr. Andr. Perthes. 1892. Latin text available at the Perseus Digital Library.
 Stephanus of Byzantium, Stephani Byzantii Ethnicorum quae supersunt, edited by August Meineike (1790-1870), published 1849. A few entries from this important ancient handbook of place names have been translated by Brady Kiesling. Online version at the Topos Text Project.

Naiads
Nymphs
Children of Asopus
Metamorphoses characters
Metamorphoses into birds in Greek mythology